Antonio Marcello Barberini, O.F.M. Cap. (18 November 1569 – 11 September 1646) was an Italian cardinal and the younger brother of Maffeo Barberini, later Pope Urban VIII. He is sometimes referred to as Antonio the Elder to distinguish him from his nephew Antonio Barberini.

Biography
Born Marcello Barberini in Florence 1569 into the Barberini family, he entered the Order of Capuchins in 1585. In 1592 he changed his baptismal name to Antonio.

He served as a priest until the election of his brother Maffeo to the papal throne as Pope Urban VIII in 1623. He traveled to Rome with a group of Capuchin brothers to serve his brother and was elevated to cardinal in 1624.

On 26 January 1625 he was appointed Bishop of Senigallia. On 2 February 1625 he was consecrated bishop by Laudivio Zacchia, Bishop of Corneto e Montefiascone, with Antonio Díaz (bishop), Bishop of Caserta, and Lorenzo Azzolini, Bishop of Ripatransone, serving as co-consecrators. Later he was appointed Grand Inquisitor of the Roman Inquisition between 1629 and 1633, Librarian of the Holy Roman Church between 1633 and 1646 and Major Penitentiary between 1633 and 1646. He served as the Camerlengo of the Sacred College of Cardinals twice. He participated in the papal conclave of 1644 which elected his brother's successor, Pope Innocent X. After the Wars of Castro Innocent X launched an investigation into the Barberini family which forced Antonio Barberini's nephews, Francesco Barberini (Senior), Antonio Barberini (Antonio the Younger) and Prince Taddeo Barberini, into exile.

Barberini died in Rome, at the age of 77 and was buried at the Santa Maria della Concezione dei Cappuccini which he helped to found.

Episcopal succession

References

1569 births
1646 deaths
Antonio
Clergy from Florence
17th-century Italian cardinals
Cardinal-nephews
Cardinals created by Pope Urban VIII
Inquisitors
Members of the Holy Office
Members of the Congregation for the Propagation of the Faith
Major Penitentiaries of the Apostolic Penitentiary
Capuchins
17th-century Italian Roman Catholic archbishops